Będzino  is a village in Koszalin County, West Pomeranian Voivodeship, in north-western Poland. It is the seat of the gmina (administrative district) called Gmina Będzino.

Before 1637 Duchy of Pomerania, next area of Farther Pomerania, was part of Germany. For the history of the region, see History of Pomerania.

The village has a population of 580.

References

Villages in Koszalin County